Kathy Brock (born July 24, 1959) is a former news anchor at WLS-TV, Chicago's ABC affiliate. She was a co-anchor of the station's 6 pm and 10 pm news broadcasts alongside Alan Krashesky.

Personal life and education

Career
Before joining ABC 7 Chicago, Brock spent six years as an anchor/reporter at KUTV-TV in Salt Lake City, Utah. She also worked at KBCI-TV in Boise, Idaho; KEPR-TV, in Pasco, Washington; and KWSU-TV in Pullman, Washington.

Brock joined WLS-TV in 1990 as a co-anchor of the morning newscast with Alan Krashesky.  From 1993 - 1998, she co-anchored the 6 pm newscast with Floyd Kalber. Since 1998, she has co-anchored it with Alan Krashesky. In 2003, after Diann Burns left ABC 7, Brock was promoted to the 10 pm newscast alongside Ron Magers. This is currently the No. 1 rated and most watched newscast in Chicago.  After 13 years together, Magers retired in May 2016 and Brock teamed up at 10 with Alan Krashesky.

Notes

External links
Biography at WLS-TV website
ABC 7 anchor Kathy Brock retiring

Television anchors from Chicago
Living people
1959 births
American television journalists
American women television journalists
People from Pasco, Washington
Washington State University alumni
21st-century American women